Malapterurus thysi is a species of electric catfish endemic to the Ivory Coast, where it occurs in the Cess (Nipoué) and Cavally river basins. This species grows to a length of  SL.

References 

Malapteruridae
Catfish of Africa
Freshwater fish of West Africa
Endemic fauna of Ivory Coast
Taxa named by Steven Mark Norris
Fish described in 2002
Strongly electric fish
Taxobox binomials not recognized by IUCN